The 1996–97 St. Francis Terriers men's basketball team represented St. Francis College during the 1996–97 NCAA Division I men's basketball season. The team was coached by Ron Ganulin, who was in his sixth year at the helm of the St. Francis Terriers. The Terrier's home games were played at the  Generoso Pope Athletic Complex. The team has been a member of the Northeast Conference since 1981.

The Terriers finished their season at 13–15 overall and 7–11 in conference play. They advanced to the NEC Tournament quarterfinals after defeating Robert Morris in the first round.

Roster

Schedule and results

|-
!colspan=12 style="background:#0038A8; border: 2px solid #CE1126;;color:#FFFFFF;"| Regular season

|-
!colspan=12 style="background:#0038A8; border: 2px solid #CE1126;;color:#FFFFFF;"| NEC Regular Season  

    
|-
!colspan=12 style="background:#0038A8; border: 2px solid #CE1126;;color:#FFFFFF;"| 1997 NEC tournament

References

St. Francis Brooklyn Terriers men's basketball seasons
St. Francis
St. Francis
St. Francis